Batrachorhina tanganjicae is a species of beetle in the family Cerambycidae. It was described by Stephan von Breuning in 1961. It is known from Tanzania. Batrachorhina is a genus of longhorn beetles.

References

Endemic fauna of Tanzania
Batrachorhina
Beetles described in 1961